Rosenblatt is a surname of German and Jewish origin, meaning "rose leaf". People with this surname include: 

Albert Rosenblatt (born 1936), New York Court of Appeals judge
Dana Rosenblatt, known as "Dangerous" (born 1972), American boxer
Elie Rosenblatt (born 1979), Canadian-born Klezmer violinist
Frank Rosenblatt  (1928-1971), American psychologist notable in the field of artificial intelligence
Jason Rosenblatt (born 1973), Canadian-born multi-instrumentalist and vocalist
Jay S. Rosenblatt (1923–2014), American psychologist and animal behavior researcher
Joan R. Rosenblatt (1926-2018), American statistician
John R. Rosenblatt (1907–1979), mayor of Omaha, Nebraska
Jonathan Rosenblatt  (born 1956), American Rabbi
Leida Rosenblatt, birth name of Epp Kaidu (1915-1976), Soviet and Estonian theatre director and actress
Louise Rosenblatt (1904–2005), American literary critic
Murray Rosenblatt (1926-2019), American statistician
Paul Gerhardt Rosenblatt (1928-2019), American judge
Richard Rosenblatt (born 1969), American businessman
Richard Heinrich Rosenblatt (1930-2015) American ichthyologist
Roger Rosenblatt (born 1940), American journalist, author, playwright and teacher
Rose Rosenblatt (born 1947), American film director
Sultana Levy Rosenblatt (1910–2007), Brazilian writer
Susan Rosenblatt, later Susan Sontag (1933–2004),  American author, filmmaker, philosopher, literary theorist and political activist
Therese Steinhardt Rosenblatt (1896–1920), American painter
Wibrandis Rosenblatt (1504–1564), German Christian active in the Protestant Reformation
William Rosenblatt (1906–1999), New York state senator
Yossele Rosenblatt (1882–1933), Ukrainian-born Jewish cantor

See also
IEEE Frank Rosenblatt Award, presented for contributions to biologically or linguistically motivated computational paradigms
Johnny Rosenblatt Stadium, baseball stadium in Omaha, Nebraska

German-language surnames
Jewish surnames
Yiddish-language surnames